Portacomaro is a comune (municipality) in the Province of Asti in the Italian region Piedmont, located about  southeast of Turin and about  northeast of Asti.

Portacomaro borders the following municipalities: Asti, Calliano, Castagnole Monferrato, and Scurzolengo.

Main sights
Well-preserved apsidal frescos can be found in the romanesque church of St. Peter  (first recorded in 1130 AD). Formerly occupied by a monastic community, the chancel sides are decorated with figures of St. Bernard and St. Sebastian. The central section of tripartite rear wall of the sanctuary (probably the oldest) features a deisis (Crucifixion with Virgin and the beloved disciple, St. John), figures of St. Andrew are to the right, St. Agatha (kneeling) and St Peter to the left.

People
Valerio Arri, Olympic marathoner
Mario José Bergoglio, father of Pope Francis

References

Cities and towns in Piedmont